Lighthouse Point, Bahamas, or simply Lighthouse Point, is a private peninsula in The Bahamas which serves as an exclusive port for the Disney Cruise Line ships. It is located in the south-eastern region of  Bannerman Town, Eleuthera. In March 2019, The Walt Disney Company purchased the peninsula from the Bahamian government, giving the company control over the area.

History

Eleuthera

Lighthouse Point
After Castaway Cay, Disney Cruise Line purchased another Bahamian destination in early March 2019, the Lighthouse Point property on the island of Eleuthera, from the Bahamas Government. The cruise line was looking for another Bahamas location since the announcement of the third ship expansion in 2016. Disney spent between $250 million and $400 million on developing the 700-acre property, incorporating Bahamian themes, and donated 190 acres, including the southernmost tip, to the government for a national park.

Disney also hired and offered training for Bahamians for construction, vending, and other employee positions. There were also increases in calls on Bahamian ports, Nassau and Freeport, of 30 to 40 percent over 2018 calls. Imagineer Joe Rohde, whose previous projects being the development of Disney's Animal Kingdom and Aulani, was assigned to oversee the ports' development, before his retirement on January 4, 2021. Construction workers were hired in March 2022, before work finally began at Lighthouse Point the following month, for an expected completion in early 2024.

See also
List of islands of the Bahamas
Castaway Cay, Disney's first private island

References

External links 
Disney's Lighthouse Point
 

Resorts in the Bahamas
Private islands of the Bahamas
Disney Cruise Line
Abaco Islands